SMK Bandar Sunway is a government secondary school located at Jalan PJS 7/15, Bandar Sunway in Petaling Jaya, Selangor, Malaysia.

See also
 Education in Malaysia

References

Schools in Selangor